is a manga authored by Yoshinori Kobayashi published by Shogakukan in November 2000. A Chinese version was published in Taiwan by Avanguard Publishing in February 2001 sparking controversy and even imposing a travel ban on the author by Taiwanese officials.

Criticism 
Critics of the book say it distorts history by claiming that Taiwanese women volunteered as comfort women for Japanese soldiers during World War II. Such claims were backed by comments from petrochemical Chi Mei Corporation Chairman Hsu Wen-lung whom the author cited as confirming that no women were forced into prostitution.

Responses to the book 
Taiwan legislators and other protesters stormed Taipei's biggest bookstore, grabbing the books and setting them on fire on the sidewalk.

On 2 March 2001 the Ministry of the Interior of the Republic of China barred Kobayashi from travel to Taiwan, igniting objections from high ranking government officials including National Policy Advisor Alice King. President Chen Shui-bian spoke out in defense of King and Kobayashi stating that freedom of speech is the right of everyone and must be safeguarded. The ban was lifted on 23 March 2001.

See also 
 Yoshinori Kobayashi
 Neo Gomanism Manifesto Special - On War
 Comfort women

References